Lithosarctia thomasi is a moth of the family Erebidae. It was described by Josef J. de Freina and Thomas Joseph Witt in 1994. It is found in Tibet, China and Nepal.

References

 

Spilosomina
Moths described in 1994